Etlingera insolita is a monocotyledonous plant species described by Axel Dalberg Poulsen. Etlingera insolita is part of the genus Etlingera and the family Zingiberaceae.

References

insolita